Thorigné-Fouillard (Gallo: Toreinyaé-Fólhard) is a commune in the Ille-et-Vilaine department in Brittany in northwestern France.

Population
Inhabitants of Thorigné-Fouillard are called Thoréfoléens in French.

See also
Communes of the Ille-et-Vilaine department

References

External links

Mayors of Ille-et-Vilaine Association 

Communes of Ille-et-Vilaine